the mountain shiner (Lythrurus lirus) is one of the 324 fish species found in Tennessee. The species is that not much data has been collected on in the years past. With a monitoring plan that could change.  It is found in three main states Tennessee, Alabama, and Georgia. In Tennessee and Alabama the species is located in common rivers, and in Virginia the species can be found in drainages in Virginia, Tennessee and Northwestern Georgia. In addition, the species is nearly restricted to the Coosa River system above the Fall Line in the Alabama River drainage.
The environment of the species is fresh benthopelagic water, and lives in a temperate range, 38°N-33°N. Lythrurus lirus typically prefers clear flowing creeks and/or small rivers. These waters typically have moderate gradients and bottom materials that range from sand-gravel to rubble-boulders. The population of this species is represented by large subpopulations and locations. However, the total adult population is not known specifically, it is speculated to be large.
The normal length of the species is typically 6 cm but it has been recorded that the maximum length to me 7.5 cm, which was a male. The peak of their mating season is between the months of May and June.
The threat of the species is more localized than any other type of threat. However, on a wide-range threat level no threat is actually known to the Lythrurus lirus. Currently the species is on a low conservation concern and is not in any dire significant need of managing or monitoring at the moment.

Geographic distribution
The species of the genus Lythrurus are commonly found in small streams that are distributed mainly in drainages of the Gulf  Coast, locations in the Mississippi Valley, and the Piedmont region of the Atlantic Seaboard. The mountain shiner normally located above the Fall Line in Tennessee region, and prefers freshwaters that are of temperate climate. The geographical range which it inhabits is from 38°N to 33°N. Now, the exact population size is not known, however, it is assumed to be fairly large. The temporal variation of population size could be subjected to extrinsic factors. An example of this for the population size variance would be the annual, seasonal and even daily level changes that occur in aquatic systems. These fluctuations are a possibly explanation of why there are sometimes subpopulations that are isolated from other populations within the same river or streams.  These fluctuations would explain the distribution of some of the populations to be scattered within the regions that it inhabits and also the same rivers and streams of different populations.

Ecology
It prefers benthopelagic freshwater. These waters are typically clear flowing, riffle-type creeks, streams or small rivers. Which these types of waters can range from sand-gravel to rubble-boulder bottoms, and contains moderate levels of gradients. The mountain shiner and the redfin shiner are considered "sister taxa". Since these two species are sister taxa it is safely assumed that they both have similar feeding habits and most likely feed on the same organisms.

Now the competition of the mountain shiner consists of mainly of the other species within the same subpopulation of Lythrurus and also other species like darters that are located within the same region. The main predators of this species are larger taxa of fish, which include the different species of trout.

Life history
Little data has been recorded on the life history, specifically, but data has been collected on its size, spawning and migrating patterns. The mountain shiner is a native species to North American and is not documented in other countries. According to a paper done by Shmidt, he states that the maximum length for most species in the genus Lythrurus is less than 70mm. For the mountain shiner specifically, the average adult size is between 35-55mm. However, some male specimens have been documented to reach a maximum size of 75 mm (Facts about mountain shiner). This rare maximum length could be due to the environment as well as nutrients that are available and maybe limited pressure from predators within the aquatic system.

The typically mating season for the mountain shiner is in between the time span of May and can end between the months of June/July, depending on location. Now the species does make seasonal migrations throughout the year. However these migrations are not of extensive distances. They travel approximately less than 200 km from their original location. The locations that they will migrate to are normally for either breeding or are winter grounds for hibernation.

Current management
Currently, mountain shiners are a least concern species on the red list. With its status as a low conservation concern, the species does not have any significantly required management or monitoring. However, some research actions are being conducted on the species. The mountain shiner though has some localized threats that are not a major problem for the species as a whole. However, there seems to be an active production of research to collect more data  to help better understand the patterns and habits of this species that is common in approximately 3 states.

Even though the species was never listed as a truly endangered species on the Red list, it was listed as low concern species. The main assumption for a problem towards the species is human interference. One reason for this would be our morphology of the habitats. This can occur with the reduction of streams, dams placed changing the flow of streams connected to rivers and containments that we introduce to the aquatic systems from run off from agriculture lands. These are just a few ideas of what could be the reason for the reduction of the populations due to human interference rather than the natural course of fluctuating water levels that was mention before.

References

Lythrurus
Fish described in 1877
Freshwater fish of the United States